Carnevale in Italy is a farewell party to eat, drink, and have fun before the limitations and solemnity of Lent. About a month before Ash Wednesday, Italians celebrate over many weekends with parades, masks, and confetti. The origins of this event may be traced to ancient Greece and Rome, when they worshipped Bacchus and Saturn. Some think they date back to archaic winter-to-spring ceremonies. Despite its pagan origins, the event was so extensively celebrated and the tradition so powerful that it was swiftly altered to fit into Catholic rituals. Carnevale is traditionally celebrated on Fat Tuesday, but the weekend prior features activities as well. The most famous carnivals in Italy are those held in Venice, Viareggio, Ivrea, Cento, Apulia and Acireale. These carnivals include masquerades and parades.

Venice

The carnival in Venice was first documented in 1296, with a proclamation by the Venetian Senate announcing a public festival the day before the start of Lent. Unquestionably one of the most well-known Carnival festivities in the world, the Carnival of Venice is rife with mystery, adventure, and conspiracy. The day served to break down barriers between people of different economic standings and religious beliefs. During the Renaissance, masked comic performers performed in Venice's piazzas. In 1979, the holiday reappeared to celebrate Venice's history and culture. Today, about 3 million people travel to Venice to take part in the famous Festa Veneziana. This makes it the most important event in the city and the biggest carnival celebration in Italy.

Viareggio

The Carnival of Viareggio is the second-most popular in Italy. It lasts a month with night and day celebrations, floats, parades, district celebrations, masked dances, and other shows. The first masquerade took place in 1873, in response to the upper classes' dissatisfaction with having to pay hefty taxes. Thousands of travelers go to Italy for parades, carnival masks and costumes, concerts, and music.

Ivrea

The Historic Carnival of Ivrea is mostly known for its Battle of the Oranges, allegory of struggle for freedom. It is valued as one of the most ancient carnivals in the world. The fight commemorates Ivrea's rebellion against Napoleonic troops in 1194. The miller's daughter, "la Mugnaia," allegedly killed the city's dictator after he tried to kidnap her, sparking an uprising that gave the inhabitants more freedom. Ivrea's Carnival celebration now includes parades in medieval costumes, folkloristic ensembles, and musical performances from Italy and Europe. While enjoying the festive ambiance, don't forget to try the typical carnival dish, Fagiolata, a delicious bean soup.

Acireale
The exquisite floats decked with fresh flowers, which give beauty and fragrance to the streets of Acireale, are largely responsible for the Carnival's reputation as one of Italy's most stunning. In the 16th century, revelers in "Acireale" used to celebrate Carnival by flinging rotten eggs and lemons, but when these activities were formally outlawed, they were replaced with far more refined traditions. Today, both floats and poets may be found at the Acireale Carnival, which is widely regarded as the "best Carnival in Sicily." In fact, it is so popular that the entire affair is recreated in August's mild summer weather.

Apulia
Not only is it the longest Carnival celebration in Europe, but it is also one of the oldest. Putignano's Carnival dates back to 1394, when St. Stephen's relics were moved inland to Putignano to safeguard them from invasion. Peasants abandoned their vineyards to join the parade, erupting in song, dancing, and improvised rhymes and poetry satirizing politicians, news, customs, and current events in the local vernacular. The festivities of this lengthy Carnival begin on December 26 and continue every Thursday until January 17, which is the feast day of St. Anthony the Great.

History
Although the origins of Carnival may be traced back to ancient Greek and Roman celebrations, it is associated with the Catholic world. In actuality, it is celebrated on Holy Days, the final day before Lent when feasting is permitted. Therefore, it does not have a fixed date, but rather relies on the day of Easter. In different places, the celebrations grew into a party and a parade for diverse causes. Whether the higher classes were exhibiting their wealth with elegantly decorated carriages or the poorer classes were following troops through the streets, carnival evolved across Italy. Many Carnivals were prohibited in the 18th century, only to be reinstated in the 20th.

Gallery

References 
 Mussio, Gina. “Carnevale in Italy: What It Is and Where to Celebrate.” Ciao Andiamo, Ciao Andiamo, 7 Dec. 2021, https://ciaoandiamo.com/carnevale-in-italy-what-it-is-and-where-to-celebrate/.
 “Most Famous Carnival Celebrations in Italy.” Edited by FireBird Tours, Firebird Tours ®, FireBirdTours, 11 Oct. 2022, https://www.firebirdtours.com/blog/most-famous-carnival-celebrations-italy.
 Savarese, Maria  Rosaria. “Carnevale in Italy - All You Need to Know about Carnival.” Learn Italian Go, Maria Rosaria Savarese Https://Learnitaliango.com/Wp-Content/Uploads/2019/09/Learn-Italian-Go-Logo.png, 26 Feb. 2021, https://learnitaliango.com/carnevale-in-italy/.